Bongmyeong Station is a station on Line 1 of the Seoul Metropolitan Subway. It opened in December 2008.

References

External links
 Station information from Korail

Seoul Metropolitan Subway stations
Metro stations in Cheonan
Railway stations opened in 2008